Mussomeli (Mussumeli in Sicilian) is a town and comune in the province of Caltanissetta, Sicily, Italy.

History
Mussomeli is claimed to have been founded in the 14th century by Manfredo III Chiaramonte with the name Manfredi, but later the current name, of Latin or Arab origin, was imposed. In 1549 it became a county under the Lanza family.

Culture
A feast is held every September for the Madonna of the Miracles. A similar feast is held simultaneously in Buffalo, NY, which has a large number of Mussomeli émigrés and their descendants.

Diaspora
Many townspeople emigrated to the UK, to London and Woking, Surrey where the Madonna dei Miracoli (Madonna of Miracles) is celebrated every July. This created a depopulation problem in the town, and as of 2021 the town is seeking foreign purchasers of the empty houses in central Mussomeli.

People linked to Mussomeli
Don Francesco Langela (1598-1679)
Don Giuseppe Langela, majon in 1625  and in 1648
Paolo Emiliani Giudici (1812-1872), writer and literary critic
Salvatore Frangiamore (1853-1915) painter
Giuseppe Sorge (1857-1937), historian, prefect and director of the public security
Giuseppe Genco Russo (1893-1976), mafioso
Santo Sorge (1908-1972), mafioso
Domenico Canalella (1914-1978), priest and Italian translator
Salvatore Cardinale (1948), Italian politician
Roberto Mistretta (1963), journalist and poet

Main sights

The Chiaramonte Castle Castello Mafredonico, built in 1370 in Norman-Gothic style. It stands on a high crag, elevation ,  outside the town. It has large halls, dungeons and torture cells, and a chapel with a precious alabaster depicting the Madonna dell Catena (1516). Near the castle are the ruins of a Greek-Italic village.
The Santuario della Madonna dei Miracoli (Church of Our Lady of the Miracles)
The Chiesa Madre of San Ludovico (14th century). It was restored along Baroque lines in the 17th century.
The Renaissance church of San Francesco.
The 17th Palazzo Trabìa, with a noteworthy art gallery.
The church of St. Anthony (16th century)

References

External links
History and traditions of Mussomeli "MUSSOMELI LIVE"

Cities and towns in Sicily
Populated places established in the 14th century
14th-century establishments in Italy